Sichuan Province Beichuan High School (S: 四川省北川中学, T: 四川省北川中學, P: Sìchuān Shěng Běichuān Zhōngxué "Beichuan Middle School", SCSBCZX) is a secondary school located in Yongchang, Beichuan Qiang Autonomous County, Sichuan.

History
Prior to the 2008 Wenchuan earthquake, the school had 2,800 students and teachers. As a result of the earthquake, over 1,000 deaths occurred at the school.

Construction began on the new school campus, located in Yongchang, on May 12, 2009. The 200 million yuan campus opened before September 1, 2010. Most of the funding came from corporations and organizations in China and from other countries. The All-China Federation of Returned Overseas Chinese sponsored the project and had it built.

Campus
The campus includes a three-story academic building. Xiong Qu of China Central Television said that the school building "has strong characters of the Qiang Nationality." Xiong wrote that the buildings could withstand a magnitude 8 earthquake. It can house up to 5,200 students.

Demographics
As of May 9, 2011 the school has 2,600 students in 53 classes.

References

External links

 Beichuan High School 

High schools in Sichuan